Celebrity Big Brother 13 was the thirteenth series of the British reality television series Celebrity Big Brother. The series launched on 3 January 2014 on Channel 5 and was originally meant to end after 22 days on 24 January 2014. However, it was extended due to ratings success and instead ended after 27 days on 29 January 2014, making it the longest Channel 5 series of the show (at the time, since beaten by Celebrity Big Brother 15) and the joint-longest series, along with Celebrity Big Brother 7 in 2010. It is the sixth celebrity series and the ninth series of Big Brother overall to air on the channel. Emma Willis returned to host the series, whilst Rylan Clark returned to present spin-off show Big Brother's Bit on the Side along with Willis.

The series was won by comedian and presenter Jim Davidson, with rapper Dappy as runner-up.

Jasmine Waltz returned to the house for Celebrity Big Brother 19 as an All-Star, representing this series. She was third to be evicted.

Pre-series

Background
The series was officially confirmed on 3 April 2012 when Channel 5 renewed the show until 2014.

Logo
The official new eye logo for the series was released on 27 November 2013. The centre of the eye has turned into one of the many cameras which are located around the house.

Presenters
Emma Willis returned to present the main show for her second celebrity series, as well as selected episodes of Big Brother's Bit on the Side. Rylan Clark returned to present Bit on the Side, but his co-host and Big Brother's Bit on the Psych host AJ Odudu was dropped. Clark hosted Bit on the Psych alongside Iain Lee, who was previously a regular panellist on the show. Celebrity Big Brother 12 housemate and former Loose Women panellist Carol McGiffin is head panellist on the show.

Sponsorship
The series sponsor was again casino website SuperCasino.

Bit on the Side scheduling
For the first time since it launched in 2011, spin-off show Big Brother's Bit on the Side only aired six days a week, with Channel 5 opting not to renew the Sunday edition, which last year ran in a lunch-time time slot and was hosted by Clark. Bit on the Side aired Monday to Friday with Bit on the Psych remaining on Saturdays.

House
The official house pictures were released on 16 December 2013. The theme for the series is 'Russian Opulence' and features the same layout as Big Brother 14 and Celebrity Big Brother 12, with minor changes. The house has a high class upgrade featuring a grand fireplace and opulent surroundings along with the small hot tub used last series.

Launch night twist
On Day 1, Jim and Linda became the first handcuffed couple to enter the house. Upon entering, they were immediately called to the diary room where Big Brother disclosed that after all housemates had entered in handcuffed pairs, they would have the power to unlock one couple including themselves. When it came to the moment, they chose Dappy and Liz. However, as they were chosen to be unlocked, they would automatically face the first public vote as a pair.

Housemates
Twelve celebrities entered the house on Day 1.

Casey Batchelor
Casey Batchelor is a British glamour model and singer from Essex. She posed for various lads' magazines such as Nuts and Zoo. Casey is also a member of the little-known girl group Miss Millionaire. She entered the house on Day 1, being handcuffed to Lee Ryan before being released on Day 3 despite failing the tasks, resulting in her and Lee facing the first eviction together as a pair. On Day 6, both of them were fake evicted and moved into the secret Bolt Hole, where they watched their housemates for two days. They returned to the house on Day 8, during a live twist where they chose to evict Evander. During her time in the house, she developed a romance with Lee - unbeknownst to her, he was also involved with Jasmine. She finished in sixth place on the final night.

Dappy
Costadinos Contostavlos, better known by his stage name Dappy, is the lead singer of hip hop/grime trio N-Dubz with his cousin Tulisa. Dappy entered the house on Day 1 handcuffed to Liz Jones. However, as part of the Launch Night twist, they were then released from each other but automatically faced the first eviction as a pair. He finished in second place behind Jim Davidson in the final on Day 27.

Evander Holyfield
Evander Holyfield is a retired American professional boxer. He is a former Undisputed World Champion in both the cruiserweight and heavyweight divisions, earning him the nickname "The Real Deal". He also represented the U.S. in the 1983 Pan American Games and the 1984 Summer Olympics, winning silver and bronze medals respectively. He entered the house on Day 1, handcuffed to Luisa Zissman. On Day 2, Evander received a formal warning from Big Brother, after he said that gay people are not normal and can be fixed, during a conversation with Luisa. Ofcom later announced that they may launch an inquiry over Holyfield's comments. He and Luisa were released from their handcuffs on Day 3, but since they lost the immunity tasks, the two were automatically put up for the first eviction. Evander became the first housemate to be evicted from the house on Day 8, following a twist which involved Casey and Lee deciding who would be evicted out of him and Luisa.

Jasmine Waltz
Jasmine Waltz is an American model and actress from Las Vegas, Nevada, who had minor roles in films and television shows such as Femme Fatales and Secret Girlfriend. She entered the house on Day 1, being handcuffed to Sam Faiers. The two were freed from their handcuffs on Day 2. During her time in the house, she was known for her romance with Lee, and involvement in a love triangle between him and Casey. Jasmine was evicted from the house on Day 13. On Day 23, she returned as a guest for the "For Whom the Bell Tolls" task, where she confronted both Casey and Lee before leaving again shortly after. She later returned to compete in Celebrity Big Brother 19 as an "All star" housemate.

Jim Davidson
James Cameron "Jim" Davidson, is a British comedian, also known for presenting TV shows such as Big Break and The Generation Game. Jim was originally meant to be taking part in the eleventh series of the show, but was arrested hours before the launch by policemen working on Operation Yewtree. He was replaced by Neil "Razor" Ruddock. On Day 1, he entered the house handcuffed to Linda Nolan, before being released on Day 2. On Day 27, Jim was crowned the winner of the series.

Lee Ryan
Lee Ryan is a British singer, known as a member of the boy band Blue. He released his self-titled debut album Lee Ryan in 2006, which landed at number 6 on the UK Albums Chart and produced the singles "Army of Lovers", "Turn Your Car Around" and "When I Think of You". On Day 1, Lee entered the house, being handcuffed to Casey Batchelor. Despite failing the tasks, Lee and Casey were released from their handcuffs on Day 3. As a result, they both faced the first eviction as a pair. On Day 6, the pair were fake evicted and moved into the secret Bolt Hole where they watched their fellow housemates for two days. They returned to the house on Day 8 during a live twist, where they both chose to evict Evander. In the house, he was known for having a romance with Casey and Jasmine, prompting a love triangle. Lee was evicted on Day 24, in a live surprise eviction.

Linda Nolan
Linda Nolan is an English-Irish singer, best known for being a member of the girl group The Nolans. She is the older sister of the late Bernie Nolan and Celebrity Big Brother 10 runner-up Coleen Nolan. After leaving the group in 1983, she went on to perform in theatre productions including Prisoner Cell Block and Blood Brothers. She entered the house on Day 1, handcuffed to Jim Davidson. According to the Belfast Telegraph, she entered in an attempt to make a turn around from her personal struggles and living from the UK benefits system. Whilst in the house, Linda constantly argued with Jim. The two had years of history, when Linda's late husband Brian Hudson was caught red-handed stealing money from comic Frank Carson's dressing room in 1995. On Day 15, he was reminded by Davidson of his antics, promoting an eruption. She was evicted on Day 22.

Lionel Blair
Lionel Blair (born Henry Lionel Ogus) was a British actor, choreographer, tap dancer and television presenter, whose entertainment career has spanned for five decades. He appeared in films such as The Limping Man, The World of Suzie Wong, The Beauty Jungle, A Hard Days Night and The Plank. In addition, he was one of the team captains on the game show Give Us a Clue from 1979 until the early 1990s. On Day 1, Lionel entered the house, handcuffed alongside Ollie Locke. But after winning immunity on Day 3, the two were set free. On Day 15, he became the third person to be evicted from the house, losing out to the remaining housemates.

Liz Jones
Elizabeth "Liz" Jones is a British journalist and newspaper columnist, who was a former editor of Marie Claire magazine. Jones is a regular columnist for the Daily Mail and The Mail on Sunday. On Day 1, Liz entered the house, being handcuffed to fellow housemate Dappy. Following the launch night's twist and task, she and Dappy were later free from their handcuffs, but both were therefore automatically nominated to face the first eviction. On Day 20, she was evicted with the least amount of the public vote. Liz received a total of 20 nominations from each housemate, the second highest from Jim's 22 nominations.

Luisa Zissman
Luisa Zissman (born Louisa Christina Kalozois) is a British retail entrepreneur and reality television contestant, who was the runner-up on the ninth series of The Apprentice. She owns her own baking website, eBay electronic businesses and cupcake shop named Dixie's Cupcakery. On Day 1, Luisa entered the house, being handcuffed to Evander Holyfield. They were finally released from each other on Day 3, despite failing the tasks. As a result, they faced the first eviction as a pair. Luckily, she was saved from the vote. Whilst in the house, she came out as bisexual and revealed that she sought treatment for sex addiction. On Day 27, she was evicted from the house and finished in fourth place. After the series ended, she became a regular panelist on Big Brother's spin-off show Big Brother's Bit on the Side.

Ollie Locke
Oliver "Ollie" Locke is a British reality television star, who is a former cast member on the E4 reality series, Made in Chelsea. On Day 1, he entered the house, handcuffed to Lionel Blair. However, they were released from each other on Day 3 after passing a task and winning immunity from the first eviction.

Sam Faiers
Samantha "Sam" Faiers is an English reality television personality and glamour model, who stars in The Only Way Is Essex. On Day 1, she entered the house, handcuffed to Jasmine Waltz, before being released on Day 2. She finished in fifth place during the final on Day 27.

Summary

Nominations table

Notes

Ratings
Official ratings are taken from BARB and include Channel 5 +1.

For the first time since Big Brother 7 in 2006, the final was more watched than the launch show: 3.69m viewers watched the launch show, but 3.71m tuned in to the final.

References

External links
 Official website
 Official Celebrity Big Brother page
 

2014 in British television
2014 British television seasons
13
Channel 5 (British TV channel) reality television shows